Checkmate is a 2008 Marathi-language thriller film.  Directed and Written by Sanjay Jadhav and produced by Kanchan Satpute and Chandrashekhar Mahamuni.

Cast
Ankush Choudhary as Vishal Korgaonkar
Swapnil Joshi as Mohan Bhave
Rahul Mehendale as Tushar Jaikar
Sonali Khare as Sunila
Sanjay Narvekar as Rajan Mahabal
Anand Abhyankar as Shekhar Divadkar
Vinay Apte as Sampatrao Mahabal
Bharat Ganeshpure as Raghu Jangam
Sandesh Jadhav as Inspector Sandesh Jadhav
Ravi Kale as Inspector Rane
Ravi Patwardhan as Vishal's father
Hrudaynath Rane as Bhalya
Uday Sabnis as Inspector Zende
Chinmayee Sumeet as Sulochana Mahabal
Smita Talwalkar as Mohan's mother
Resham Tipnis
Madhura Velankar
Priya Khopkar
Asit Redij

Music
The film has only 1 song which is composed by Ajay–Atul and Sunil Kaushik with lyrics are penned by Arl Desouza & Ajay Atul

References

 https://m.facebook.com/checkmatemarathimovie

External links

2000s Marathi-language films
2008 films
Films scored by Ajay–Atul
Films directed by Sanjay Jadhav